Noagaon is a village in Noagaon Union, Sarail Upazila, Brahmanbaria District in the Chittagong Division of eastern Bangladesh.

See also
 List of villages in Bangladesh

References

Populated places in Brahmanbaria District